Andrew "Andy" Roosevelt Headen (born July 8, 1960) is a former professional American football linebacker for six seasons for the New York Giants in the National Football League. He played college football for Clemson University and helped win the 1981 National Championship game.

1960 births
Living people
People from Asheboro, North Carolina
Players of American football from North Carolina
American football linebackers
Clemson Tigers football players
New York Giants players